Manono is an island of Samoa, situated in the Apolima Strait between the main islands of Savai'i and Upolu, 3.4 km west-northwest off Lefatu Cape, the westernmost point of Upolu.

There are four villages on the island with a total population of 889 (2006 Census). Electricity was only introduced in 1995 and there are several shops with beach fale accommodation for visitors. The boat trip from Upolu island takes about 20 minutes.

The neighbouring islands are Apolima, which has a small village settlement and the islet Nu'ulopa.

Manono Island is part of the political district Aiga-i-le-Tai. The majority of people in the Aiga-i-le-Tai district live on the 'mainland' at the west end of Upolu island. Dogs of any kind are prohibited on Manono island.

Villages
The four villages and their populations on Manono Island are

Apai, west (111)
Faleu, south (354)
Lepuia'i, southwest (223)
Salua, north (201)

Out of the four inhabited islands of Samoa, Manono Island has the third largest population, after the much larger islands of Upolu and Savai'i. There are no cars or roads. The main thoroughfare is a footpath that follows the coast. Dogs and horses are banned for environmental reasons. However, dogs were sighted on the island in September 2016.

In the early 19th century, the island was sometimes called Flat Island, because it consists of a small, flat hill and surrounding low-lying terrain, which is only visible at close approach.

During the 1800s, Manono island was a stronghold for the Methodist church and its early mission in Samoa. At an annual church meeting held here on 21 September 1859 a decision was made to establish a training institution on Upolu island which eventually led to the establishment of Piula Theological College in Lufilufi.

Neighbouring islands
The other two islands in the Apolima Strait are Apolima with one small village and the tiny uninhabited island of Nu'ulopa which is 700 meters west-northwest of the northwestern corner of Manono. Nu'ulopa is 37 m high and about 100 meters in diameter (0.01 km²).

Gallery

See also
Archaeology in Samoa
Samoa Islands

References

Islands of Samoa
Archaeological sites in Samoa
Aiga-i-le-Tai